The Civilian Planning and Conduct Capability (CPCC) is the directorate of the External Action Service (EEAS) of the European Union (EU) that serves as operational headquarters (OHQ) for the civilian missions of the Common Security and Defence Policy (CSDP).

Through the Joint Support Coordination Cell (JSCC), the CPCC cooperates with its military counterpart, the Military Planning and Conduct Capability (MPCC).

The CPCC is situated in the Kortenberg building in Brussels, Belgium, along with a number of other CSDP bodies.

Director

The CPCC Director, as Civilian Operations Commander (Civ OpCdr), exercises command and control at strategic level for the operational planning and conduct of all civilian crisis management operations. The Civ OpCdr is assisted by number of senior policy experts.

Divisions
The CPCC is composed of the following divisions as of September 2019:

Conduct of operations
The Conduct of Operations Division is in continuous contact with the civilian CSDP missions. On behalf of the Civ OpCdr it supports Heads of Mission (HoMs) and mission staff to deliver on their respective mandates, and ensures that the political objectives of the High Representative (HR/VP) and the member states are followed by the missions.

The division consists of three geographically-organised sections, made up of administrator (AD) and assistand (AST) officials, seconded national experts including subject matter experts on policing, rule of law and maritime issues:
Europe
Africa
Asia/Middle East

This division also has responsibility for the revision of OPLANs in line with CIVCOM and PSC advice.

Chief of Staff/Horizontal Co-ordination
The Chief of Staff Division is responsible for internal co-ordination of day-to-day issues. On top of that it has strategic responsibilities which are carried out by two sections:
Operational Capability: This section is primarily responsible for providing guidance on cross-cutting issues such as lessons learnt, including the development of operational guidelines to ensure greater consistency and coherence on operational mandate delivery.
Operational Planning: This section supports operational planning and establishment of civilian CSDP missions, establishing Planning Teams to develop operational planning documents such as the Concept of Operation (CONOPS) and Operational Plan (OPLAN), and to support Missions in all aspects of their start-up phase.

Mission Personnel
The Missions Personnel Division is in charge of human resources policy for civilian missions and organises the selection of international mission staff. The division is responsible for seconded Staff and interacts with the seconding authorities on all issues related to the secondments. For international contracted staff, the division is in charge of horizontal contractual issues and coordinates all legal aspects, as well as litigation. The division is the data protection correspondent for the civilian missions, and coordinates Ombudsman cases for the Directorate. The division is the lead service for the Goalkeeper project, which is the main IT instrument for the selection of staff. the contacts assists the Missions in the management of their staff. Together with Missions Operational Support Division the Mission Personnel Division develops IT applications for human resources management.

Missions Operational Support
The Missions Operational Support Division is responsible for CIS, IT applications as well as logistics and procurement at Headquarters level. The Division manages the delivery of equipment to the ten civilian CSDP Missions, ensuring that all the financial and legal rules are adhered to in the procurement and usage of such equipment. In this function, the division also liaises with the civilian CSDP Warehouse located in Southern Sweden and managed by the Swedish Civil Contingencies Agency (MSB).  Furthermore, the division assists the civilian Missions in defining and managing their budgets with the relevant stakeholders (EU Member States and Foreign Policy Instruments). The division is the contact point of the CPCC for the RELEX Working Group of the Council.

Role in the command and control structure

See also

Military Planning and Conduct Capability
List of military and civilian missions of the European Union

References

External links

Common Security and Defence Policy bodies of the European External Action Service